Montastruc-la-Conseillère is a railway station in Montastruc-la-Conseillère, Occitanie, France. It is on the Brive-Toulouse (via Capdenac) railway line. The station is served by TER (local) services operated by SNCF.

Train services
The following services currently call at Montastruc-la-Conseillère:
local service (TER Occitanie) Toulouse–Albi–Rodez
local service (TER Occitanie) Toulouse–Castres–Mazamet

References

Railway stations in Haute-Garonne